Mónica Ocampo Medina (born 4 January 1987) is a Mexican professional footballer who plays as a forward for CF Pachuca and the Mexico women's national team.

Club career
From 2006 to 2009, Ocampo played with W-League club FC Indiana.

In 2010, she signed with Atlanta Beat in the WPS. She made 17 appearances for the club and scored three goals.

On 11 January 2013 she joined Sky Blue FC in the new National Women's Soccer League (NWSL).  On 26 June 2013, Ocampo scored goals in the 85th and 92nd minute to lead Sky Blue to a 2–2 tie with FC Kansas City. On 10 August, Ocampo scored two goals in a 3–3 tie between Sky Blue and the Chicago Red Stars.

Ocampo was voted player of the week in the NWSL on 19 June 2013 and player of the month for August 2013.  Although she only started nine out of the 22 matches that Sky Blue played in the regular season, she scored a higher percentage of goals per minute of playing time than any other player in the league. She was awarded the Golden Boot as Sky Blue's most prolific scorer.

International career
Ocampo represented Mexico at the 2004 CONCACAF U-19 Women's Qualifying Tournament. At senior level, she scored a long–range equalizer against England in Mexico's first group match of the 2011 FIFA Women's World Cup. In 2019, that goal was voted by FIFA the best goal all-time in the Women's World Cup.

Honours and achievements

Individual
 Liga MX Femenil Team of The Season: Apertura 2017

See also

 List of Mexican Fútbol (soccer) athletes
 List of people from Morelos, Mexico

References

External links
 
 
 Profile  at Mexican Football Federation
 
 Monica Ocampo profile at National Women's Soccer League
 Monica Ocampo profile at Sky Blue FC

1987 births
Living people
Mexican women's footballers
Footballers from Morelos
Women's association football forwards
Mexico women's international footballers
2011 FIFA Women's World Cup players
2015 FIFA Women's World Cup players
Footballers at the 2007 Pan American Games
Pan American Games bronze medalists for Mexico
Pan American Games medalists in football
Footballers at the 2011 Pan American Games
Footballers at the 2015 Pan American Games
USL W-League (1995–2015) players
F.C. Indiana players
Women's Professional Soccer players
Atlanta Beat (WPS) players
National Women's Soccer League players
NJ/NY Gotham FC players
Liga MX Femenil players
C.F. Pachuca (women) footballers
Mexican expatriate women's footballers
Mexican expatriate sportspeople in the United States
Expatriate women's soccer players in the United States
Medalists at the 2011 Pan American Games
Medalists at the 2015 Pan American Games
Mexican footballers